The Riverfront Loop is a line of the Memphis Area Transit Authority trolley system.  It began operation in 1997, as the second line in the system. It runs for  through downtown Memphis and along the Mississippi riverfront, with 18 stops along the way.  It is the longest of the system's three lines, though it concurrent with the Main Street Line for about half of its length. Part of the line offers panoramic views of the Mississippi River from atop to the Chickasaw Bluffs.

Trolley service on this line has been suspended since June 2014, after two trolley cars caught fire within a span of about six months. Buses have been serving the Riverfront Loop since then, but MATA plans to restore trolley operation to the line eventually. In September 2021, MATA was predicting that the line would reopen in late 2022, but as of December 2022 the service remained suspended, with no predicted date for the planned reopening.

Route description

As the line functions as a "loop" it does not have any termini. From Amtrak's Central Station in the South Main Arts District, it runs north joining the original Main Street Line along the Main Street pedestrian mall. Passing Front Street, it turns south along the Illinois Central (IC) tracks toward the Pyramid Arena. The loop goes under the Interstate 40 bridge, emerging in front of the Cook Convention Center along the waterfront. Continuing along the IC tracks, it follows the riverfront until the tracks overlay Tennessee Street. Here, the loop continues along Tennessee eventually turning east onto GE Patterson Avenue. The loop is completed when it travels under the IC tracks in front of Central Station, and turns back onto South Main Street.

List of trolley stops
between North End Terminal and Central Station counterclockwise
Note:  Trolley service on the Riverfront Loop is temporarily suspended indefinitely; route is on detour using transit buses.

References

Memphis Area Transit Authority
Railway lines opened in 1997